Tomanj is a village in Serbia. It is situated in the Krupanj municipality, in the Mačva District of Central Serbia. The village had a population of 433 in 2002, all of whom were ethnic Serbs.

Historical population

1948: 612
1953: 636
1961: 601
1971: 502
1981: 433
1991: 451
2002: 433

References

See also
List of places in Serbia

Populated places in Mačva District